is a private junior college in the city of Nara in Nara Prefecture, Japan. The predecessor of the school, founded in 1931, was chartered as a women's junior college in 1965. In 2001 it became coeducational, adopting the present name at the same time.

See also
 Nara Women's University

External links
 

Educational institutions established in 1931
Private universities and colleges in Japan
Universities and colleges in Nara Prefecture
Japanese junior colleges
1931 establishments in Japan